Geoffroy's cat (Leopardus geoffroyi) is a small wild cat native to the southern and central regions of South America. It is about the size of a domestic cat. It is listed as Least Concern on the IUCN Red List because it is widespread and abundant over most of its range.

Taxonomy
 
Geoffroy's cat is named after the 19th century French zoologist Étienne Geoffroy Saint-Hilaire (1772–1844). It was identified as Felis geoffroyi in 1844 by French naturalists Alcide d'Orbigny and P. Gervais on the basis of three specimens that d'Orbigny had collected on the banks of the Rio Negro in Patagonia during his travels in South America between 1826 and 1833. Five subspecies have been described based on geographic dispersement:
L. g. geoffroyi: Central Argentina
L. g. euxantha: Northern Argentina, Western Bolivia
L. g. leucobapta: Patagonia
L. g. paraguae: Paraguay, Southeastern Brazil, Uruguay, Northern Argentina
L. g. salinarum: Northwestern and Central Argentina

Since 2017, Geoffroy's cat is considered a monotypic species.

Genetic studies have shown that Geoffroy's cat is most closely related to the kodkod.

Characteristics
The Geoffroy's cat is about the size of a domestic cat, but has numerous black spots and dark bands on the cheeks, head and neck as well as on the tail and limbs. The background colour of its fur varies from a brownish-yellow coat in the northern part of its range to a more grayish coat in the south. The underbelly hair is cream-coloured or even white. The backs of the ears are black with white spots. Black individuals are common.

Males are usually larger than females, and Geoffroy's cat in the south are larger than those from the north.
It has a bite force quotient at the canine tip of 106.3.

Distribution and habitat
The Geoffroy's cat is distributed in Argentina, Bolivia, Brazil, Chile, Paraguay and Uruguay. It prefers open woodland or scrubland with plenty of cover, but also occurs in grasslands and marshy areas. It is thought to be rare in Chile.

Ecology and behaviour 
The Geoffroy's cat is nocturnal and a solitary hunter that contacts conspecifics only during the mating season. Geoffroy's cats have been observed to stand up on their hind legs to scan the surrounding landscape and use their tail as a support, an unusual behaviour among cats. It is able to climb trees but rarely does, except to leave faeces to scent mark its territory.

It is at the top of the food chain in its range and preys primarily on rodents, hares, other small mammals, birds, snakes, small lizards, insects, and occasionally frogs and fish.

Reproduction
The breeding season for Geoffroy's cats lasts from October to March. During this time, the female comes into estrus for periods of up to twelve days, between three and five weeks apart. Mating during this time is brief and frequent, often taking place on a high ledge or similar site.

Gestation lasts for 72–78 days. Most births occur between December and May. Litters consist of one to three kittens, and one or two is more common.

The eyes open after eight to nineteen days, and they begin to eat solid food at six or seven weeks. Kittens become independent of their mother at around eight months, but are generally not sexually mature until 18 months for females and 24 months for males.

Conservation
From the 1960s to the 1980s, Geoffroy's cats were hunted extensively for their pelts for the international fur trade, but little trade took place after 1988 and the species was upgraded to CITES Appendix I status in 1992.
Legislation introduced in the late 1980s made hunting and domestic trade of Geoffroy's cat's pelts illegal in Argentina, Bolivia, Brazil, Chile, Paraguay, and Uruguay. International trade in Cites Appendix I listed species is now prohibited, except for non-commercial purposes.

References

External links

Leopardus
Felids of South America
Mammals of Patagonia
Geoffroy's Cat
Geoffroy's Cat
Geoffroy's Cat
Geoffroy's Cat
Geoffroy's Cat
Geoffroy's Cat
Mammals described in 1844
Taxa named by Paul Gervais
Mammals of Brazil